The Croydon transmitting station is a broadcasting and telecommunications facility on Beaulieu Heights in Upper Norwood, London, England, in the London Borough of Croydon, owned by Arqiva. It was established in 1955 and initially used a small lattice tower.

It was originally used to broadcast the London ITV signal on VHF Band III. When UHF broadcasting began, the nearby Crystal Palace transmitting station was used. VHF television was discontinued in 1985, and the Croydon transmitter was not used for regular TV broadcasting until 1997, when a new directional UHF antenna, designed to avoid interference with continental transmitters, was installed to carry the newly launched Channel 5 in the London area. It carried Channel 5's analogue signal, and the digital terrestrial signal is transmitted from Crystal Palace. Croydon also had reserve transmitters for BBC1, BBC2, ITV and Channel 4, but these were used only in the event of engineering works or a failure at Crystal Palace. Since the digital switchover in April 2012 no television has been broadcast from Croydon, but it is still used as a backup for Crystal Palace for the BBC A & B, Digital 3&4 and COM 4, 5 and 6 multiplexes.

The site is also a maintenance base for transmitter maintenance teams and used to house one of four Regional Operations Centres.

Channels listed by frequency

Analogue radio (FM VHF)

† Backup for Crystal Palace.

Digital radio (DAB)

Analogue television

22 September 1955 – 3 January 1985
The past ITV franchises which originally served London were Associated-Rediffusion (weekdays) and Associated Television (weekends) began transmitting on VHF 9 on 22 September 1955, and were the first ITV services. The transmitter's power was originally 60 kW but after the new tower was built in 1962 this was increased to 400 kW. Thames Television and London Weekend Television took over the London franchise area in 1968. The VHF analogue service closed down, along with the rest of the UK, on 3 January 1985.

30 March 1997 – 18 April 2012
Channel 5 launched on 30 March 1997 with transmissions from Croydon and other former IBA VHF sites in the UK. Reserve senders for ITV and Channel 4 was later added in case they were not available from Crystal Palace and some time later, BBC1 and BBC2.

† Backup for Crystal Palace.

Digital television

18 April 2012 – present
Since 18 April 2012, no television has been broadcast from Croydon. However, backup for the PSB1, 2 and 3 and COM4, 5 and 6 multiplexes are available should there be a problem at Crystal Palace.

† Backup for Crystal Palace.

See also
Wrotham transmitting station, Brookmans Park transmitting station and Droitwich transmitting station – the main radio transmitters serving London on VHF, mediumwave and longwave respectively.
List of tallest towers in the world
List of tallest structures in the United Kingdom

References

External links
 The Transmission Gallery: Croydon Transmitter photographs and information
 BBCEng.info: Story of the rivalry between the ITA and the BBC to be the first to complete their transmitting towers in south London
  Croydon Transmitter at thebigtower.com

Infrastructure in London
Crystal Palace, London
Transmitter sites in England
Buildings and structures in the London Borough of Croydon